Zgornje Mladetiče is a small village west of Krmelj in the historical region of Lower Carniola in east-central Slovenia. It belongs to the Municipality of Sevnica and is included in the Lower Sava Statistical Region.

References

External links
Zgornje Mladetiče at Geopedia

Populated places in the Municipality of Sevnica